Hasan Raza (born 1 June 1995) is a Pakistani first-class cricketer who plays for Habib Bank Limited.

References

External links
 

1995 births
Living people
Pakistani cricketers
Habib Bank Limited cricketers
Pakistan Television cricketers